Azeryol Baku is an Azerbaijani women's volleyball club.

History
Azeryol Baku is an Azerbaijani women's volleyball club and immediately got the right to participate in the 2012-2013 Azerbaijan Women's Volleyball Super League

Team

As Azeryol Baku

Season 2015–2016, as of December 2015.

As Baki-Azeryol Baku

Honours
  Azerbaijan Superleague:
  Runners-up (1): 2013-14
  Third (1): 2014–15, 2016–17

References

External links

Azerbaijani volleyball clubs
Volleyball clubs established in 2012
2012 establishments in Azerbaijan
Sports teams in Baku